was a feudal domain under the Tokugawa shogunate of Edo period Japan, located in Hitachi Province (modern-day Ibaraki Prefecture), Japan. It was centered on Ushiku Jin'ya in what is now the city of Ushiku, Ibaraki.  It was ruled for much of its history by the Yamaguchi clan.

History
In 1590 after the victory of Toyotomi Hideyoshi in the Siege of Odawara, Akai Teruko was rewarded with a territory of 5,435 koku in Ushiku, Ibaraki. The Yamaguchi clan was a junior branch of the Ōuchi clan and originated in what is now Yamaguchi Prefecture. Yamaguchi Shigemasa served Oda Nobukatsu and subsequently came into the service of Tokugawa Ieyasu. For his efforts at the Battle of Sekigahara, he was awarded a 5,000 koku holding in Kazusa Province and another 5000 koku holding in Musashi Province, to which he subsequently added another 5000 koku in Shimotsuke Province.  However, he fell afoul of the Tokugawa shogunate when he arranged the marriage of his son and heir, Yamaguchi Shigenobu to a daughter of Ōkubo Tadachika without bothering to ask for permission first. For this violation he was stripped of his holdings and placed under house arrest. After apologizing, and after the death of Shigenobu in combat during the Siege of Osaka as a common soldier, Ieyasu relented and restored him to a 15,000 koku holding in Tōtōmi Province.  He traded this holding for an equivalent in Hitachi Province in 1628, marking the start of Ushiku Domain. 

Shigemasa's fourth son and successor Yamaguchi Hirotaka constructed the jin’ya; however, he also divided 5,000 koku of the domain to his younger brother Shigetsune. The descendants Of Yamaguchi Hirotaka continued to rule the 10,000 koku domain until the Meiji restoration.

The domain had a total population of 8,604 people in 1,646 households per a census in 1869, of which 434 people in 130 households were classed as samurai.

Holdings at the end of the Edo period
As with most domains in the han system, Ushiku Domain consisted of several discontinuous territories calculated to provide the assigned kokudaka, based on periodic cadastral surveys and projected agricultural yields. In the case of the Yamaguchi, their holdings were divided between Hitachi and Shimosa provinces.

Hitachi Province
11 villages in Niihari District
13 villages in Kawachi District
2 villages in Shida District
Shimosa Province
1 village in Toyoda District
4 villages in Okada District
2 villages in Soma District

List of daimyō

References

Notes

External links
 Ushiku  on "Edo 300 HTML"

Domains of Japan
1871 disestablishments in Japan
States and territories disestablished in 1871
Hitachi Province
History of Ibaraki Prefecture